Timotheus Höttges (born 18 September 1962) is a German businessman who has been serving as chief executive officer of Deutsche Telekom AG, the majority shareholder of T-Mobile US, since 2014.

Early life
He was born in Solingen in North Rhine-Westphalia (Nordrhein-Westfalen). His father was an engineer, with three children.
He went to the August-Dicke-Schule (named after August Dicke) in Solingen, one of four gymnasium schools (similar to selective grammar schools) in Solingen. He then did his Zivildienst – compulsory community work.

Education 
Höttges received a degree in Business (Betriebswirtschaftslehre) from the University of Cologne (Universität zu Köln).

Career

VIAG AG
Höttges worked for VIAG in Munich from 1992. VIAG merged with VEBA (Düsseldorf) in 2000 to form Düsseldorf-headquartered E.ON.

Deutsche Telekom AG

Höttges joined Deutsche Telekom in 2000. From 2006-09 he worked on the T-Home brand, for internet DSL customers, and developed the Telekom Entertain (former T-Home Entertain) internet TV service into a market leader. He joined the company's board of directors on 5 December 2006. On 1 March 2009 he became Finance Director of Deutsche Telekom.

He then became CEO of Deutsche Telekom on 1 January 2014, succeeding René Obermann in that role. Following BT Group's takeover of EE, formerly a joint venture of Deutsche Telekom and Orange, Höttges became a member of BT Group's board of directors.

Other activities

Corporate boards
 T-Mobile US, Chairman Board of Directors
 Daimler, Member of the Supervisory Board (since 2020)
 FC Bayern Munich, Member of the Supervisory Board
 BT Group, Non-Executive Member of the Board of Directors (since 2016)
 Henkel, Member of the Supervisory Board (since 2016)
 EE Limited, Non-Executive Member of the Board of Directors (-2014)
 OTE, Non-Executive Member of the Board of Directors (2011-2013)

Non-profit organizations
 Deutsche Telekom Stiftung, Chairman of the Board of Trustees
 European Round Table of Industrialists (ERT), Member
 European School of Management and Technology (ESMT), Member of the Board of Trustees
 Federation of German Industries (BDI), Member of the Presidium (2017-2019)
 Deutsche Sporthilfe, Member of the Foundation’s Council (since 2015)

Personal life
Höttges lives with his wife and two sons in the Bad Godesberg district of Bonn, in the south of North Rhine-Westphalia. The headquarters of T-Mobile and Deutsche Telekom are in Bonn.

References

External links
 LinkedIn Profile
 Deutsche Telekom
 Instagram Profile

1962 births
Deutsche Telekom
British Telecom people
FC Bayern Munich board members
German telecommunications industry businesspeople
German chief executives
Businesspeople from Bonn
People from Solingen
University of Cologne alumni
Living people